Real Girl is the debut solo studio album by British singer Mutya Buena. It was released on 4 June 2007 via Island Records, following her departure from UK girl group the Sugababes in December 2005.

Singles
"Real Girl", the album's lead single, was digitally released on 14 May 2007. The single was produced by Full Phatt, a London-based production company. It peaked at number two on the UK Singles Chart, becoming Buena's most successful single. It also reached the top ten in Finland, Slovakia and the Netherlands. The second single from the album, "Song 4 Mutya (Out of Control)", was released on 27 July 2007. The song was a collaboration with electronic music duo Groove Armada. It peaked at number eight on the UK Singles Chart, becoming Buena's second top-ten solo single. "Song 4 Mutya" received heavy airplay in Australia, where it peaked at number twenty-four. It also managed to chart in other countries including Ireland, the Netherlands and Finland, where it peaked at number twelve on the Finnish Singles Chart. "Just a Little Bit" was chosen to be the third single, and was released in late October 2007 in the United Kingdom. The single peaked at number sixty-five on the UK Singles Chart. The fourth and final single from the album, "B Boy Baby" featuring Amy Winehouse, was released in late December and peaked at number seventy-three on the UK Singles Chart.

The track, "Strung Out" was written by Amelle Berrabah, who subsequently replaced Buena after she left the group. The Sugababes confirmed during a radio interview that the band recorded an uptempo version but ultimately did not use it. The track was later given to Buena without her knowledge of Berrabah's writing contributions. Buena was reportedly unhappy upon finding this out, but record company executives pushed for the song's inclusion on the album. Upon the release of "Real Girl", Sugababes became aware of Buena's version. Berrabah is not credited as a writer in the liner notes.

Critical reception

Real Girl earned generally mixed reviews from music critics. Caroline Sullivan from The Guardian found that "what emerges from her debut album is the fact that she'd quite like to be compared to Mary J. Blige, but will settle for Jamelia. Turning her back on Suga-pop, she has set herself up as a sophisticated urban girl, availing herself of the talents of Groove Armada, Amy Winehouse and George Michael to produce perfectly buff R&B. The Armada collaboration [...] stands out as a grinding electronic rave-up that's unmatched by anything else here." AllMusic editor Sharon Mawer described the album as "a mixture of danceable R&B songs" rated the album three out of five stars.  Jaime Gill, writing for Yahoo! Music UK, found that "a few more spiky moments like this "["B Boy Baby"] and "Song 4 Mutya", and a few less mid-tempo snoozes like "It's Not Easy", and this could have been a brilliant, bold debut by one of our most interesting pop stars. As it is, it will have to settle for an interesting mixed bag." Krissi Murison from NME felt that Real Girl was "a debut's worth of octave-warbling, R&B dross. And not even Winehouse herself (who rocks up on backing vocals on "B Boy Baby" – the not-quite-funny re-working of The Ronettes classic of nearly the same name) can stop it being any less of a letdown."

Chart performance
Real Girl debuted and peaked at number ten on the UK Albums Chart, having sold 35,103 copies. It reached Silver status after only four days of release and was certified Gold by British Phonographic Industry on 14 December 2007. In Ireland, the album charted at number fifty-one. It also managed to chart on the Netherlands and Switzerland albums charts, at number seventy-one and sixty-six, respectively.

Track listing

Notes
 signifies an additional producer
 signifies a remix producer
Amy Winehouse is credited as a backing vocalist for "B Boy Baby", not as a featured artist.
Sample credits
"Real Girl" contains excerpts from "It Ain't Over 'til It's Over" (1991) as written and performed by Lenny Kravitz.
"Song 4 Mutya (Out of Control)" contains elements of "Let's Be Adult" (1984) as written by Arto Lindsay and Peter Scherer and performed by Ambitious Lovers.
"Suffer for Love" contains a sample of "Sorry I Can’t Help You" (1970) as written by Gus Redmond, Larry Brownlee, and Lowrell Simon and performed by The Lost Generation.
"B Boy Baby" is a derivative of "Be My Baby" (1963) as written by Phil Spector, Ellie Greenwich, and Jeff Barry and performed by The Ronettes.

Charts

Weekly charts

Year-end charts

Certifications

References

2007 debut albums
Mutya Buena albums